Morse Spur is a spur projecting south from the Saint Johns Range between Deshler Valley and Crawford Valley in Victoria Land. Named by the Advisory Committee on Antarctic Names in 2005 after David L. Morse, Institute for Geophysics, University of Texas, Austin; ten Antarctic field seasons, from 1990 to 2004, including four at the Taylor Dome ice core site, three conducting aerogeophysical research in both East and West Antarctica, and three seasons of ground-based studies of the Bindschadler Ice Stream in West Antarctica and Taylor Glacier in Victoria Land.

References

Mountains of Victoria Land